Mário Henrique Simonsen (c. 1935  – 9 February 1997) was a Brazilian economist, who served as Brazil's finance minister from 1974 to 1979.

Simonsen was appointed Brazil's finance minister by President Ernesto Geisel with instructions to reduce the country's runaway inflation rate.

Despite Simonsen's efforts, the official inflation rate had risen to 40% per annum in 1979 and he was shifted to Planning Minister.

He was succeeded by Antonio Delfim Netto, with whom he had an uneasy relationship due to the latter's inclination to increase borrowing, and hence inflation.

Simonsen resigned from Cabinet in 1980 and became a director of Citicorp, a position he held until 1995 when he was forced by ill-health to retire. He was a chronic heavy smoker and suffered from emphysema.

Other interests
Simonsen was an excellent baritone and an opera aficionado.

Family
He was married to Iluska Pereira da Cunha Simonsen. Thy had two sons and a daughter.

See also
Portuguese Wikipedia entry

References 

Brazilian economists
1935 births
1997 deaths